During the 2004–05 English football season, Southampton Football Club competed in the Premier League. It was the club's 27th consecutive season in the English top flight and their 120th year in existence, The team would be relegated at the end of the season after a 2–1 loss against Manchester United, they exited the FA Cup on the sixth round due to a 4–0 loss against Manchester United that was broadcast on the BBC, they were also eliminated from the Carling Cup in the fourth round, losing 5–2 against Watford. This season would also be Peter Crouch's only season with the club as he was transferred to Liverpool at the end of the season, while playing for the Saints he would earn his first England call-up.

Season summary
Manager Paul Sturrock left Southampton by mutual consent in August, after only six months as manager; his resignation was attributed to a disappointing run of form and rumours of player unrest and boardroom dissatisfaction with his management. His replacement, Steve Wigley, failed to improve results and he has soon sacked with the club in deep relegation peril. Harry Redknapp came from arch-rivals Portsmouth in an attempt to save the Saints, but despite being able to attain safety and another season of Premiership football by winning on the last day of the season, Southampton lost 2–1 at home to Manchester United and were relegated from the Premiership in last place.

Final league table

Kit
The season's kit was manufactured by the club's own brand, Saints. The kit was sponsored by English life insurance company Friends Provident.

First-team squad
Squad at end of season

Left club during season

Reserve squad

Statistics

Appearances, goals and cards
(Starting appearances + substitute appearances)

Transfers

In
  Jelle Van Damme –  Ajax, £2,500,000, 9 June 2004
  Peter Crouch –  Aston Villa, £2,000,000, 9 July 2004
  Andreas Jakobsson –  Brøndby IF, £1,000,000, 31 August 2004
  Kasey Keller –  Tottenham Hotspur, 12 November 2004, month loan
  Calum Davenport –  Tottenham Hotspur, 3 January 2005, five-month loan
  Jamie Redknapp –  Tottenham Hotspur, 4 January 2005, free transfer
  Nigel Quashie –  Portsmouth, 17 January 2005, £2,100,000
  Olivier Bernard –  Newcastle United, undisclosed (believed to be £400,000), 31 January 2005
  Henri Camara –  Wolverhampton Wanderers, 31 January 2005, four-month loan
  Alaeddine Yahia –  Guingamp,  £350,000
  Mikael Nilsson –  Halmstad, £400,000

Out
  Agustín Delgado – released (later joined  Aucas), 17 June 2004
  Mike Williamson –  Wycombe Wanderers, season loan, 4 July 2004
  Fitz Hall –  Crystal Palace, £1,500,000, 12 August 2004
  Stephen Crainey –  Leeds United, £200,000, 26 August 2004
  Martin Cranie –  Bournemouth, loan, 29 October 2004
  Arron Davies –  Yeovil Town, undisclosed, 16 December 2004
  Kenwyne Jones –  Sheffield Wednesday, loan, 17 December 2004
  James Beattie –  Everton, 4 January 2005, £6,000,000
  Yoann Folly –  Nottingham Forest, month loan, 7 January 2005
  Alan Blayney –  Rushden & Diamonds, loan, 1 February 2005
  Alan Blayney –  Brighton & Hove Albion, loan, 24 March 2005
  Jason Dodd –  Plymouth Argyle, month loan, 24 March 2005
  Dexter Blackstock –  Plymouth Argyle, loan
  Leon Best –  Queens Park Rangers, loan
  Stuart Anderson –  Blackpool

Matches

Premier League

FA Cup

League Cup

References

Southampton F.C. seasons
Southampton